Mont Donon is the highest peak in the northern Vosges. It is a Category 2 climb in the Tour de France.

On Donon, there is an 80 metre tall lattice tower for TV transmission. Its TV transmission antennas are covered by a polymeric cylinder, which gives its structure a characteristic shape.

An engraved block of sandstone near the summit commemorates the conception of Victor Hugo.

Many archaeological remains of a Gallo-Roman sanctuary have been found on and around the top of the mountain. They are now displayed in the Musée archéologique de Strasbourg.

World War I 

During the earliest stages of World War I, Mount Donon was the site of heavy fighting between German and French troops between 14 August and 22 August 1914 and specially on 21 and 22 August.

References

 

Mountains of the Vosges
Mountains of Bas-Rhin
One-thousanders of France
Bas-Rhin communes articles needing translation from French Wikipedia